Spencer Allen Block (15 July 1908 – 7 October 1979) was an English first-class cricketer active 1928–48 who played for Surrey. Played rugby for the Harlequins and trialed for England. Represented and captained England at hockey. He was born in Esher; died in Meadle.

References

1908 births
1979 deaths
English cricketers
Surrey cricketers
Cambridge University cricketers
Marylebone Cricket Club cricketers
Free Foresters cricketers